The 1949–50 OB I bajnokság season was the 13th season of the OB I bajnokság, the top level of ice hockey in Hungary. Four teams participated in the league and Meteor Mallerd won the championship.

Regular season

2nd place game 
 MTK Budapest - Ferencvárosi TC 5:3

External links
 Season on hockeyarchives.info

Hun
OB I bajnoksag seasons
1949–50 in Hungarian ice hockey